David Nicholas Figlio (born October 14, 1970) is the Provost of the University of Rochester in Rochester, New York. He is an American economist who formerly served as the Dean of the School of Education and Social Policy at Northwestern University. He also served as the Orrington Lunt Professor of Education and Social Policy and is the former director of Northwestern's Institute for Policy Research. He is known for studying school accountability and school choice, as well as the relationship between children's names and their later educational outcomes. He is the editor-in-chief of the Journal of Human Resources. In 2017, he was elected to the National Academy of Education.

In January of 2022, Figlio was named the Provost and Chief Academic Officer of University of Rochester in Rochester, New York. He departed from Northwestern University and starting his tenure at University of Rochester in June of 2022.

References

External links
Faculty page

Northwestern University faculty
Living people
1970 births
University of Wisconsin–Madison alumni
Academic journal editors
Education economists
21st-century American economists
American education writers